Utopian experiment is an alternative name for an intentional community. 
It also may refer to:
	
 Impossible Cities: A Utopian Experiment, a multidisciplinary play
 Social experiment for evaluation of utopian proposals.
 Utopia Experiment, a social experiment in Scotland